Tutov is a rural locality (a khutor) in Akhtubinskoye Rural Settlement, Sredneakhtubinsky District, Volgograd Oblast, Russia. The population was 84 as of 2010. There are 6 streets.

Geography 
Tutov is located near Pakhotny Erik, 11 km northwest of Srednyaya Akhtuba (the district's administrative centre) by road. Bruny is the nearest rural locality.

References 

Rural localities in Sredneakhtubinsky District